Ivan Matthias Mulumba is a Ugandan writer and valuation surveyor. He is the author of two collections of poems, Poetry in Motion and Rumblings of a tree, and a novel, The Honking. His work has appeared in The Kalahari Review, Reader's Cafe Africa, Africa Book Club, Munyori literary journal, Lawino-magazine, and Sooo Many Stories. 
He was nominated for the 2018 Young Achievers Awards.

Early life and education
Mulumba was born in Masaka District in the Central Region of Uganda to Gerald Jjagwe and Dorothy Namakula Jjagwe. His father worked as a valuation surveyor while his mother ran a bookshop. When his mother's bookshop closed, the books were stocked at home, something that introduced Mulumba to reading early in his life and sparked a desire for storytelling.

He studied at Bishop Ddungu Boarding Primary School, Blessed Sacrament Kimaanya Primary School, St. Henry's College Kitovu, and then Makerere University, where he obtained a Bachelor of Science degree in Land Economics.

 Writing 
Mulumba's first collection of poems, Poetry in Motion, was called "an enterprising first" by the Africa Book Club.

The Daily Monitor called it "an anthology that chronicles the first steps of a poet, and captures the beliefs, experiences and some ideologies in society".

His story "Chasing my tail" was runner-up for the October 2013 Africa Book Club short reads competition. Another story, "Into the Bush", was the winning story in December 2013 for the same monthly competition.

His work has also been featured on the Pan-African poetry platform Badilisha Poetry Radio.

 Works 

 Novels 

 Short story collection 

 Blank walls: Obwenyi bw'emirimago. Uganda: Mattville Publishing House. 2020. 

 Poetry collections 

 

 Poems 
"Children of the Wind", "Listen", "Froth", in 
"Doorway", in 
 "Urchin" and "Naked thief", in 
"Mary has a ball", in 
"My Palestine", and "When nobody is watching" in Badilisha Poetry - Pan African Poets (2016)
"Until I See No More", "Light" and "Such A Thief " in Kalahari Review (2015)
"Forever Gone" in Sooo Many Stories (2015)
"Shamim", "A Memory", "Breathe", "The love of my life" and "Rumblings of a tree" in Munyori literary journal (2014)
"Chicken Fight, and Enough" in The Kalahari Review (2014)
"Trumpeter, and Void" in The Kalahari Review (2013)

 Short fiction 
"Into the Bush" and "Chasing my tail", in 
"Jar of misfortune" in Lawino (2015)
 "Blank walls" in The Kalahari Review (2014)
"Into the darkness" in Reader's Cafe Africa'' (2013)

Awards and recognition
Nominated for the 2018 Young Achievers Awards.

References

External links 
"NoViolet Bulawayo: Everything I produce is African | Dispatches from Kampala by Bwesigye Bwa Mwesigire"

Living people
1987 births
Ugandan writers
People from Masaka District
Makerere University alumni
Ugandan male short story writers
Ugandan short story writers
21st-century Ugandan poets
Ganda people
Ugandan male poets
21st-century short story writers
Ugandan novelists
21st-century male writers